Topknot may refer to:

 A hairstyle or haircut, historically prevalent in Asia:
Chonmage, a traditional Japanese haircut worn by men
Sangtu, a knot of hair that married men of the Joseon Dynasty wore in Korea
Touji (頭髻), a traditional Chinese hairstyle which involves tying all hair into a bun, worn from earliest times up to the end of the Ming Dynasty and still worn by Taoist priests and practitioners
Sikha, worn by orthodox Hindus priest, who involves in ritual practices in temples.
Khokhol, oseledets traditional Ukrainian haircut
The Suebian knot, is a historical male hairstyle ascribed to the tribe of the Germanic Suebi
Tikitiki, a top-knot worn by high-ranking Māori men
 Sidelock of youth worn by pharaonic children in Middle-Kingdom Egypt, indicating association with the child Horus 
Man bun, a modern Western style of topknot influenced by the Asian style, a trend beginning in the 2010s
 Several species of fishes:
 The New Zealand topknot, Notoclinus fenestratus
 The Norwegian topknot, Phrynorhombus norvegicus
 The Brown topknot, Notoclinus compressus
 Several species in the genus Zeugopterus
 Topknot pigeon, Lopholaimus antarcticus